Derek Christopher Chedzey (b 1967) has been Archdeacon of Hereford since 2018.

Chedzey was educated at  Trinity College, Bristol and the University of Wales. He was ordained deacon in 1993, and priest 1994. After curacies in Bedgrove and Haddenham he held incumbencies at High Wycombe, Tiverton and Frenchay. He was a Canon Residentiary at Bristol Cathedral from 2015 until his appointment as Archdeacon.

References

1967 births
Living people
21st-century English Anglican priests
20th-century English Anglican priests
Alumni of Trinity College, Bristol
Alumni of the University of Wales
Archdeacons of Hereford